Prospect Peak el.  is a mountain peak in the Washburn Range of Yellowstone National Park. Between 1883-85, members of the Arnold Hague Geological Surveys named the peak Surprise Peak for reasons not now known. In 1880, then superintendent Philetus Norris had named the peak Mount Stephans for one of his assistants, C. N. Stephans. However, in 1885 Arnold Hague, for reasons again not known today, gave the peak its present name—Prospect Peak. The USGS has also mapped this summit as Mount Stephens. and also cited Surprise Peak as an alternate name.

See also
 Mountains and mountain ranges of Yellowstone National Park

Notes

Mountains of Wyoming
Mountains of Yellowstone National Park
Mountains of Park County, Wyoming